Pedro Casado Bucho (20 November 1937 – 10 January 2021) was a Spanish footballer who played as a defender.

Club career
Casado spent one full decade under contract to Real Madrid, but only played seven La Liga seasons effectively with the team. He won 11 major titles during his spell, including six national championships (five consecutive) and two European Cups, even though he did not appear in any games in the latter competition in the victorious campaigns (1956–57 and 1965–66).

Casado played three more seasons in the top flight with CE Sabadell FC – no matches in his last year – following which he moved to amateur football with Club Deportivo Toluca in Santander, retiring from the game in 1971 at the age of 33.

International career
Casado gained one cap for Spain, appearing in a 2–0 friendly win over France on 2 April 1961, in his hometown of Madrid.

Honours
Real Madrid
European Cup: 1956–57, 1965–66
Intercontinental Cup: 1960
La Liga: 1956–57, 1960–61, 1961–62, 1962–63, 1963–64, 1964–65
Copa del Rey: 1961–62
Latin Cup: 1957

External links
 
 

1937 births
2021 deaths
Footballers from Madrid
Spanish footballers
Association football defenders
La Liga players
Segunda División players
Real Madrid CF players
Real Madrid Castilla footballers
CE Sabadell FC footballers
Spain international footballers